The Shire of Kerang was a local government area located in northwestern Victoria, Australia, along the Murray River. From 1966 onwards, Kerang itself was managed by a separate entity; the Borough of Kerang.

History

The Swan Hill Road District, which initially covered most of northwestern Victoria, was incorporated on 8 July 1862, and became a shire on 14 August 1871. The Shire of Gordon was severed and incorporated on 26 May 1885, from parts of the East and West Loddon Ridings, with the Shire of Mildura following suit on 10 January 1890, from the Lower Murray Riding. The Shire of Castle Donnington was severed on 30 May 1893, from the remainder of those three ridings. The remainder of the shire was renamed the Shire of Kerang on 31 December 1898.

On 8 March 1922, parts of the North East and South East Ridings severed and was incorporated as the Shire of Cohuna, while the area around Kerang itself was incorporated as the Borough of Kerang on 1 April 1966. On 5 July 1977, the Shire of Gordon annexed parts of the South West Riding.

On 20 January 1995, the Shire of Kerang was abolished, and along with the Borough of Kerang and the Shire of Cohuna, was merged into the newly created Shire of Gannawarra. The Tresco township was transferred to the newly created Rural City of Swan Hill.

Wards

The Shire of Kerang was divided into three ridings on 1 April 1990, each of which elected three councillors:
 Central Riding
 East Riding
 West Riding

Towns and localities

Population

* Estimate in the 1958 Victorian Year Book.

References

External links
 Victorian Places - Kerang Shire

Kerang Shire
1862 establishments in Australia
Kerang, Victoria